Kindite is an adjective referring to:

Kinda (tribe), an ancient and medieval Arab tribe
Kingdom of Kinda, a tribal kingdom in north and central Arabia in –